Raymonda Elisa Florentina Vergauwen  (15 March 1928 – 5 April 2018) was a Dutch breaststroke swimmer holding a Belgian passport (her father was from Belgium). She was born and died in Sas van Gent, Zeeland, the Netherlands. She won a gold medal in the 200m breaststroke event at the 1950 European Aquatics Championships and participated in the 1952 Summer Olympics, but did not reach the finals.

References

1928 births
2018 deaths
Belgian female breaststroke swimmers
Olympic swimmers of Belgium
Swimmers at the 1952 Summer Olympics
European Aquatics Championships medalists in swimming
People from Sas van Gent
Sportspeople from Zeeland